Alan Parrish is a character in Jumanji.

Alan Parrish may also refer to:

Alan K. Parrish, professor at Brigham Young University

See also
Allen Parish, Louisiana